Banbar may refer to:

Banbar County, county in Tibet
Banbar Town, town in Banbar County